Arctic Rose is the 1992 debut album of Canadian singer-songwriter Susan Aglukark. Initially released independently with very little distribution outside the Northwest Territories, the album was subsequently rereleased across Canada in 1995 following Aglukark's commercial breakthrough with This Child.

The album won the Best Music of Aboriginal Canada Recording award at the Juno Awards of 1995.

Track listing
 "Arctic Rose" (Susan Aglukark, Randall Prescott, Terry Tufts) – 4:07
 "Song of the Land" (Barry Brown, Eric Emerson, Bob Morrison) – 4:03
 "Still Running" (Aglukark, Charlie Major) – 4:11
 "Wonderin' Child" (Jon Park-Wheeler) – 3:26
 "Learn to Love Yourself" (Aglukark, Park-Wheeler, Prescott) – 3:06
 "Searching" (Agluark, Crosley) – 3:34
 "Anger and Tears" (Aglukark, Park-Wheeler) – 3:49
 "Rollin' On" (Agluark, Major) – 2:49
 "Mama's Prayers" (Aglukark, Brown) – 2:52
 "Amazing Grace" (Aglukark, John Newton) – 4:37

References

1992 debut albums
Susan Aglukark albums
EMI Records albums
Juno Award for Indigenous Music Album of the Year albums